Labarthe-Rivière is a commune in the Haute-Garonne department in southwestern France.

Geography

Climate

Labarthe-Rivière has a oceanic climate (Köppen climate classification Cfb).

Population

Gallery

See also
Communes of the Haute-Garonne department

References

Communes of Haute-Garonne
Haute-Garonne communes articles needing translation from French Wikipedia